The Pan-American Roller Hockey Club Championship is an annual roller hockey club competition organized by World Skate America - Rink Hockey with the most successful teams of the America. Since its foundation the Argentina teams have dominated the competition. Until 2013 and in 2015 and 2016 it was organized by the South American Skating Confederation (CSP), in 2017 it was organized by the Pan-American Skating Confederation and since 2018 it has been organized by World Skate America - Rink Hockey.

The 2013 edition was considered cancelled, after the illegalities committed during the tournament by the organization (CSP) and the South American Roller Sports Confederation. Due to a crisis in the South American Skating Confederation, the 2014 edition was organized by the Argentinian Federation, while in 2015 and 2016 it was again organized by the South American Skating Confederation. In 2017 it was organized by the Pan-American Skating Confederation. Since 2018 it has been organized by World Skate America - Rink Hockey.

Winners

Wins by team

Wins by country

References

Roller hockey competitions